The Jurubatiba Sandbank National Park is a national park in the Brazilian state of Rio de Janeiro. The park has approximately 44 kilometres of sandbank coast.

History
The park was created on 29 April 1998. It spreads along the coast of Quissamã, Carapebus and Macaé municipalities. More than 60% of its area are inside the Quissamã municipality, around 30% inside Carapebus and the rest in Macaé.

Geography
Area: 148.6 km²

Notes

External links

 Jurubatiba Localization Map
 Project Sustainable Jurubatiba - Photos
 Quissamã Municipality - Jurubatiba's Photo Gallery

National parks of Brazil
Protected areas of Rio de Janeiro (state)